Johann Pregesbauer (born 8 June 1958) is a retired football defender from Austria. Pregesbauer spent his whole club career with Rapid Wien and was also in the Austria squad for the 1982 FIFA World Cup.

External links
 
 

1955 births
Living people
Austrian footballers
Austria international footballers
Association football defenders
1982 FIFA World Cup players
Austrian Football Bundesliga players
SK Rapid Wien players
Footballers from Vienna